Chester Allen Wynne (November 23, 1898 – July 17, 1967) was an American football player, coach, and college athletics administrator. He served as the head coach at Midland College–now known as Midland University–in Fremont, Nebraska (1922), Creighton University (1923–1929), Auburn University (1930–1933), and the University of Kentucky (1934–1937), compiling a career college football record of 81–60–9. Wynne was born in Long Island, Kansas. He played fullback at the University of Notre Dame from 1919 to 1921 and professionally for the Rochester Jeffersons of the National Football League (NFL) in 1922. At Auburn, Wynne tallied a 22–15–2 record, including a 9–0–1 mark in 1932, when his team won the Southern Conference title. He then coached at the Kentucky where he compiled a 20–19 record At Kentucky, he also served as athletic director from 1933 to 1938. Wynne died on July 17, 1967 at West Suburban Hospital in Oak Park, Illinois.

Head coaching record

References

External links
 
 

1898 births
1967 deaths
American football fullbacks
Auburn Tigers athletic directors
Auburn Tigers football coaches
Creighton Bluejays football coaches
Kentucky Wildcats athletic directors
Kentucky Wildcats football coaches
Midland Warriors football coaches
Notre Dame Fighting Irish football players
Notre Dame Fighting Irish men's track and field athletes
Rochester Jeffersons players
People from Phillips County, Kansas
Coaches of American football from Kansas
Players of American football from Kansas
Track and field athletes from Kansas